The 2018–19 Furman Paladins men's basketball team represented Furman University during the 2018–19 NCAA Division I men's basketball season. The Paladins, led by second-year head coach Bob Richey, played their home games at Timmons Arena in Greenville, South Carolina as members of the Southern Conference. They finished the season 25–8, 13–5 in Socon play to finish in a tie for second place. They defeated Mercer in the quarterfinals of the SoCon tournament before losing in the semifinals to UNC Greensboro. They received an at-large bid to the National Invitation Tournament where they lost in the first round to Wichita State. This season was the first team in school history to be ranked in the AP Poll.

Previous season
The Paladins finished the 2017–18 season 23–10, 13–5 in SoCon play to finish in third place. They defeated Western Carolina in the quarterfinals of the SoCon tournament before losing in the semifinals to East Tennessee State. Despite having 23 wins, they did not participate in a postseason tournament.

Roster

Schedule and results
In its first two road games, Furman had a pair victories over teams that had reached the final four of the 2018 NCAA Division I men's basketball tournament: Loyola on November 9 and defending national champion Villanova on November 17. On December 3, 8–0 Furman became ranked in the AP Poll for the first time in school history. 

|-
!colspan=9 style=| Regular season

|-
!colspan=9 style=| SoCon tournament

|-
!colspan=9 style=| NIT

Source

Rankings

References

Furman Paladins men's basketball seasons
Furman
Furm
Furm
Furman